The Platinum Jubilee Act of Loyalty Parade was a military parade held at the Palace of Holyroodhouse in Edinburgh, Scotland on 28 June 2022, organised as part of the Queen's Platinum Jubilee celebrations. Performed as a tribute to the Queen as Head of the British Armed Forces, on behalf of all three branches of the British Armed Forces, it featured all three services, with each of the single service Senior Representatives in Scotland present, together with Service Cadets.

The Act of Loyalty also marked the 200th anniversary of King George IV's visit to Scotland in 1822, known as the "King's Jaunt", which included General Sir Robert Abercromby, the then Governor of Edinburgh Castle, presenting the castle key to the Sovereign for the first time.

The ceremony 

The Armed Forces conducted a parade and Presentation of the Key for Edinburgh Castle in the gardens of the Palace of Holyroodhouse. A Royal Salute took place as the Queen arrived in the gardens via the Equerry's Door. Lord Lyon King of Arms then presented three Senior Representatives from the Royal Navy, Army and Royal Air Force in Scotland to the Queen. Three cadets, also representing each Service, then paraded the key to Edinburgh Castle across the gardens, which was received by Major General Alastair Bruce of Crionaich, Governor of Edinburgh Castle.

The Governor, assisted by three Service Cadets, then proceeded to the Equerry's Door and addressed the Queen:

The Queen responded:

Three cheers for the Queen were then given by members of the Armed Forces before a pipe tune composed for the Platinum Jubilee called Diu Regnare was played, as she returned to the palace.

On completion of the parade, the ceremonial troops dispersed and the Key to Edinburgh Castle was returned to lie in the Great Hall. A new marker was added to the Chain to the Key representing its formal presentation to the Sovereign.

Music 

Musical support was provided by the Band of the Royal Marines Scotland and the Pipes and Drums of The Royal Regiment of Scotland.

See also 
 Diamond Jubilee Armed Forces Parade and Muster

References 

2022 in Scotland
21st-century military history of the United Kingdom
Festivals in Edinburgh
Military parades in the United Kingdom
Platinum Jubilee of Elizabeth II
June 2022 events in the United Kingdom
2020s in Edinburgh